India possesses nuclear weapons and previously developed chemical weapons. Although India has not released any official statements about the size of its nuclear arsenal, recent estimates suggest that India has 160 nuclear weapons and has produced enough weapons-grade plutonium for up to 200 nuclear weapons. India has conducted nuclear weapons tests in a pair of series namely Pokhran I and Pokhran II.

India is a member of three multilateral export control regimes — the Missile Technology Control Regime, Wassenaar Arrangement and Australia Group. It has signed and ratified the Biological Weapons Convention and the Chemical Weapons Convention. India is also a subscribing state to the Hague Code of Conduct. India has signed neither the Comprehensive Nuclear-Test-Ban Treaty nor the Nuclear Non-Proliferation Treaty, considering both to be flawed and discriminatory. India previously possessed chemical weapons, but voluntarily destroyed its entire stockpile in 2009 — one of the seven countries to meet the OPCW extended deadline.

India maintains a "no first use" nuclear policy and has developed a nuclear triad capability as a part of its "Minimum Credible Deterrence" doctrine.

Biological weapons 

India has ratified the Biological Weapons Convention (BWC) and pledges to abide by its obligations. There is no clear evidence, circumstantial or otherwise, that directly points toward an offensive BW program. India does possess the scientific capability and infrastructure to launch an offensive BW program. In terms of delivery, India also possesses the capability to produce aerosols and has numerous potential delivery systems ranging from crop dusters to sophisticated ballistic missiles.

No information exists in the public domain suggesting interest by the Indian government in delivery of biological agents by these or any other means. To reiterate the latter point, in October 2002, the then President A. P. J. Abdul Kalam asserted that "India will not make biological weapons. It is cruel to human beings".

Chemical weapons 

In 1992,  India signed the Chemical Weapons Convention (CWC), becoming one of the original signatories of the CWC in 1993, and ratified it on 2 September 1996. According to India's ex-Army Chief General Sundarji, a country having the capability of making nuclear weapons does not need to have chemical weapons, since the dread of chemical weapons could be created only in those countries that do not have nuclear weapons. Others suggested that the fact that India has found chemical weapons dispensable highlighted its confidence in the conventional weapons system at its command.

In June 1997, India declared its stock of chemical weapons (1,045 tonnes of sulphur mustard). By the end of 2006, India had destroyed more than 75 percent of its chemical weapons/material stockpile and was granted extension for destroying the remaining stocks by April 2009 and was expected to achieve 100 percent destruction within that time frame. India informed the United Nations in May 2009 that it had destroyed its stockpile of chemical weapons in compliance with the international Chemical Weapons Convention. With this India has become third country after South Korea and Albania to do so. This was cross-checked by inspectors of the United Nations.

India has an advanced commercial chemical industry, and produces the bulk of its own chemicals for domestic consumption. It is also widely acknowledged that India has an extensive civilian chemical and pharmaceutical industry and annually exports considerable quantities of chemicals to countries such as the United Kingdom, United States and Taiwan.

Nuclear weapons 

As early as 26 June 1946, Jawaharlal Nehru, soon to be India's first Prime Minister, announced: 

Nehru pursued a policy of formally foregoing nuclear weapons while at the same time constructing a civilian nuclear energy program, and by extension the capability to make a nuclear bomb. This policy was motivated by a conventional weapons superiority over its rivals Pakistan and China. India built its first research reactor in 1956 and its first plutonium reprocessing plant by 1964. India's nuclear programme can trace its origins to March 1944 and its three-stage efforts in technology were established by Homi Jehangir Bhabha when he founded the nuclear research centre, the Tata Institute of Fundamental Research.

India's loss to China in a brief Himalayan border war in October 1962, provided the New Delhi government impetus for developing nuclear weapons as a means of deterring potential Chinese aggression.  By 1964 India was in a position to develop nuclear weapons. Prime Minister Lal Bahadur Shastri opposed developing nuclear weapons but fell under intense political pressure, including elements within the ruling Indian National Congress. India was also unable to obtain security guarantees from either the United States or the Soviet Union. As a result, Shastri announced that India would pursue the capability of what it called "peaceful nuclear explosions" that could be weaponized in the future.

India first tested a nuclear device in 1974 (code-named "Smiling Buddha"), under Prime Minister Indira Gandhi as a peaceful nuclear explosion. The test used plutonium produced in the Canadian-supplied CIRUS reactor, and raised concerns that nuclear technology supplied for peaceful purposes could be diverted to weapons purposes.  This also stimulated the early work of the Nuclear Suppliers Group. During the 1970s and the 1980s Prime Ministers Indira Gandhi, Morarji Desai, and Rajiv Gandhi opposed weaponizing its nuclear program beyond PNE's and theoretical research. In 1982, Indira Gandhi refused to allow the Defence Research and Development Organisation to develop active nuclear weapons, but also approved the Integrated Guided Missile Development Programme that would develop missiles to deliver a nuclear warhead if India developed one. India also supported international nuclear non-proliferation and arms control efforts.

The situation changed again in the late 1980s after the 1987 Brasstacks crisis and the beginning of the Pakistani nuclear weapons program. In 1989, Prime Minister Rajiv Gandhi gave Defense Secretary Naresh Chandra approval to develop the bomb. Chandra continued the program through successive governments in the 1990s after Gandhi lost power in the 1989 general election. India most likely completed weaponized nuclear warheads around 1994. India performed further nuclear tests in 1998 (code-named "Operation Shakti") under Prime Minister Atal Bihari Vajpayee. In 1998, as a response to the continuing tests, the United States and Japan imposed sanctions on India, which have since been lifted.

Neutron bombs
R Chidambaram, who headed India's Pokhran-II nuclear tests, said in a 1999 interview with the Press Trust of India that India is capable of producing a neutron bomb.

India's no-first-use policy
India has a declared nuclear no-first-use policy and is in the process of developing a nuclear doctrine based on "credible minimum deterrence." In August 1999, the Indian government released a draft of the doctrine which asserts that nuclear weapons are solely for deterrence and that India will pursue a policy of "retaliation only". The document also maintains that India "will not be the first to initiate a nuclear first strike, but will respond with punitive retaliation should deterrence fail" and that decisions to authorise the use of nuclear weapons would be made by the Prime Minister or his 'designated successor(s)'. According to the NRDC, despite the escalation of tensions between India and Pakistan in 2001–2002, India remained committed to its nuclear no-first-use policy.

India's Strategic Nuclear Command was formally established in 2003, with an Indian Air Force officer, Air Marshal Tej Mohan Asthana, as the Commander-in-Chief. The joint services SNC is the custodian of all of India's nuclear weapons, missiles and assets. It is also responsible for executing all aspects of India's nuclear policy. However, the civil leadership, in the form of the CCS (Cabinet Committee on Security) is the only body authorised to order a nuclear strike against another offending strike. The National Security Advisor Shivshankar Menon reiterated a policy of "no first use" against nuclear weapon states and "non use against non-nuclear weapon states" in a speech on the occasion of Golden Jubilee celebrations of National Defence College in New Delhi on 21 October 2010, a doctrine Menon said reflected India's "strategic culture, with its emphasis on minimal deterrence. In April 2013 Shyam Saran, convener of the National Security Advisory Board, affirmed that regardless of the size of a nuclear attack against India, be it a miniaturised version or a "big" missile, India will retaliate massively to inflict unacceptable damage.

In 2016, Defence Minister Manohar Parrikar questioned the no first use policy, asking why India should "bind" itself when it is a "responsible nuclear power". Later he clarified that this was his personal opinion. Defence Minister Rajnath Singh in 2019 said that in the future, India's no first use policy might change depending upon the "circumstances". In a January 2022 statement, however, the Ministry of External Affairs reiterated India's doctrine of "maintaining a credible minimum deterrence based on a No First Use posture and non-use of nuclear weapons against non-nuclear weapon states".

Indian nuclear triad

Air-launched nuclear weapons

Nuclear-armed fighter-bombers were India's first and only nuclear-capable strike force until 2003, when the country's first land-based nuclear ballistic missiles were fielded.

In addition to their ground-attack role, it is believed that the Dassault Mirage 2000s and SEPECAT Jaguars of the Indian Air Force are able to provide a secondary nuclear-strike role. The SEPECAT Jaguar was designed to be able to carry and deploy nuclear weapons and the Indian Air Force has identified the jet as being capable of delivering Indian nuclear weapons. The most likely delivery method would be the use of bombs that are free-falling and unguided.

Three airbases with four squadrons of Mirage 2000H (about 16 aircraft with 16 bombs from 1st and 7th squadrons of the 40th Wing at Maharajpur Air Force Station) and Jaguar IS/IB (about 32 aircraft with 32 bombs from one squadron each at Ambala Air Force Station and Gorakhpur Air Force Station) aircraft, are believed to be assigned the nuclear strike role.

Land-based ballistic missiles

The estimated 68 nuclear warheads of land-based nuclear weapons of India are under the control of and deployed by the Strategic Forces Command, using a variety of both vehicles and launching silos. They currently consist of six different types of ballistic missiles, the Agni-I, the Agni-II, Agni-III, Agni-IV, Agni-V, Agni-P and the Army's variant of the Prithvi missile family – the Prithvi-I. However, the Prithvi missiles are less useful for delivering nuclear weapons because they have a shorter range and must be deployed very close to the India–Pakistan border. Additional variants of the Agni missile series have recently been inducted including the most recent, the Agni-IV and the Agni-V, which is currently being deployed. Agni-VI is also under development, with an estimated range of 8,000–12,000 km and features such as Multiple independently targetable reentry vehicles (MIRVs) or Maneuverable reentry vehicles (MARVs).

Sea-based ballistic missiles

The Indian Navy has developed two sea-based delivery systems for nuclear weapons, completing Indian ambitions for a nuclear triad, which may have been deployed in 2015.

The first is a submarine-launched system consisting of at least four 6,000 tonne (nuclear-powered) ballistic missile submarines of the Arihant class. The first vessel, INS Arihant, was commissioned in August 2016. She is the first nuclear-powered submarine to be built by India. A CIA report claimed that Russia provided technological aid to the naval nuclear propulsion program. The submarines will be armed with up to 12 Sagarika (K-15) missiles armed with nuclear warheads. Sagarika is a submarine-launched ballistic missile with a range of 700 km. This missile has a length of 8.5 meters, weighs seven tonnes and can carry a pay load of up to 500 kg. Sagarika has already been test-fired from an underwater pontoon, but now DRDO is planning a full-fledged test of the missile from a submarine and for this purpose may use the services of the Russian Navy. India's DRDO is also working on a submarine-launched ballistic missile version of the Agni-III missile, known as the Agni-III SL. The new missile will complement the older and less capable Sagarika submarine-launched ballistic missiles. However, the Arihant class ballistic missile submarines will be only capable of carrying a maximum of four Agni-III SL.

The second is a ship-launched system based around the short range ship-launched Dhanush ballistic missile (a variant of the Prithvi missile). It has a range of around 300 km. In the year 2000 the missile was test-fired from INS Subhadra (a Sukanya class patrol craft). INS Subhadra was modified for the test and the missile was launched from the reinforced helicopter deck. The results were considered partially successful. In 2004, the missile was again tested from INS Subhadra and this time the results were reported successful. In December 2005 the missile was tested again, but this time from the destroyer INS Rajput. The test was a success with the missile hitting the land based target.

International response 

India is not a signatory to either the NPT or the Comprehensive Nuclear-Test-Ban Treaty (CTBT), but did accede to the Partial Nuclear Test Ban Treaty in October 1963. Journalist, conspiracy theorist, and holocaust denier Gregory Douglas claims CIA officer Robert Crowley told him in an interview in 1993 that India's pursuit of the programme disturbed the United States and that the CIA assassinated Prime Minister Shastri and Homi Bhabha in 1966. India is a member of the International Atomic Energy Agency (IAEA), and four of its 17 nuclear reactors are subject to IAEA safeguards. India announced its lack of intention to accede to the NPT as late as 1997 by voting against the paragraph of a General Assembly Resolution which urged all non-signatories of the treaty to accede to it at the earliest possible date. India voted against the UN General Assembly resolution endorsing the CTBT, which was adopted on 10 September 1996. India objected to the lack of provision for universal nuclear disarmament "within a time-bound framework." India also demanded that the treaty ban laboratory simulations. In addition, India opposed the provision in Article XIV of the CTBT that requires India's ratification for the treaty to enter into force, which India argued was a violation of its sovereign right to choose whether it would sign the treaty. In early February 1997, Foreign Minister I. K. Gujral reiterated India's opposition to the treaty, saying that "India favors any step aimed at destroying nuclear weapons, but considers that the treaty in its current form is not comprehensive and bans only certain types of tests."

In August 2008, the International Atomic Energy Agency (IAEA) approved safeguards agreement with India under which the former will gradually gain access to India's civilian nuclear reactors. In September 2008, the Nuclear Suppliers Group granted India a waiver allowing it to access civilian nuclear technology and fuel from other countries. The implementation of this waiver makes India the only known country with nuclear weapons which is not a party to the NPT but is still allowed to carry out nuclear commerce with the rest of the world.

Since the implementation of the NSG waiver, India has signed nuclear deals with several countries including France, United States, Mongolia, Namibia,  Kazakhstan and Australia while the framework for similar deals with Canada and the United Kingdom are also being prepared.

Domestic legislation 
India has a number of laws in whole or in partial measure that deal with the regulation of weapons of mass destruction. They include the Weapons of Mass Destruction and their Delivery Systems (Prohibition of Unlawful Activities) Act of 2005. In April 2022 a bill was tabled to amend the 2005 act to include the financing of proliferation.

See also 

 Weapons of mass destruction
 India–United States Civil Nuclear Agreement
 Weapons of mass destruction
 Nuclear Command Authority (India)

 Defence related 
 Indian military satellites
 Guided missiles of India
 Indian Armed Forces
 Indian Human Spaceflight Programme

References

Further reading 
 Abraham, Itty (1998). The Making of the Indian Atomic Bomb. Science, Secrecy, and the Postcolonial State. London and New York: Zed Books. .
 Perkovich, George (1999). India's Nuclear Bomb: The Impact on Global Proliferation. Berkeley, Los Angeles, and London: University of California Press. .
 Pahuja, Om Parkash (2001). India: A Nuclear Weapon State. New Delhi: Ocean Books. .
 Pant, Harsh V., Yogesh Joshi (2018). Indian Nuclear Policy. Oxford University Press. online review
 Szalontai, Balázs (2011). The Elephant in the Room: The Soviet Union and India’s Nuclear Program, 1967-1989. Nuclear Proliferation International History Project Working Paper #1. Washington, D.C.: Woodrow Wilson Center Press.
 Gurmeet Kanwal (2016). India’s Nuclear Force Structure 2025. Carnegie Endowment for International Peace
 Sarkar, Jayita (2022). Ploughshares and Swords: India's Nuclear Program in the Global Cold War. Cornell University Press. [Free Download]

External links 
Indian nuclear weapons program at The Nuclear Weapon Archive
At Nuclear Files:
Nuclear India's nuclear confrontation with Pakistan
Nuclear weapon stockpiles
CIA on India's nuclear program
India's missile testing ranges
Video interviews taken at the 2008 NPT PrepCom on the United States-India Peaceful Atomic Energy Cooperation Act
Annotated bibliography for India's nuclear weapons program at the Alsos Digital Library for Nuclear Issues.
Woodrow Wilson Center's Nuclear Proliferation International History Project, including a collection of primary-source documents on Indian nuclear development.
The National Security Archive's "Nuclear Vault" features a number of compilations of declassified US government documents related to India's nuclear program.

Nuclear weapons programme of India
Military of India
History of the Republic of India
Weapons of mass destruction by country